This is a list of volumes and chapters that comprise the Muhyo & Roji's Bureau of Supernatural Investigation manga series.  Written by Yoshiyuki Nishi the series premiered in Japan in Weekly Shōnen Jump in December 2004, and ran until its conclusion in the March 3, 2008 issue. The individual chapters of the series were collected and published in 18 tankōbon volumes by Shueisha. The plot focuses on a young genius Magical Law Executor, Toru Muhyo, and his assistant, Jiro Kusano, as they track and find ghosts, then send the spirits to heaven or hell depending on the account of their lives in his magical law book.

The series is licensed for an English–language release in North America by Viz Media, which released the first volume of the series in October 2007 under its "Shonen Jump" manga line.



Volume list

References
General
 

Specific

Lists of manga volumes and chapters